Chandole is a village in Bapatla district of the Indian state of Andhra Pradesh. It is located in Pittalavanipalem mandal of Bapatla revenue division.

History 
Bhattiprolu and Buddham are nearby villages wherein located Buddhist Mahastupa of 3-2 BCE with relics of Buddha and a bronze Buddha statue dated to 8 AD respectively.

Velanadu is said to be 'an old name for Chandhavolu country' (i.e, western part of Kistna delta) The chieftains who ruled over Velanadu came to be known as Velanati Choda. They belong to the Durjaya family. They claim their descent from Cholas of South India. They were subordinate allies of Chalukya-Cholas of South India and were entrusted with the responsibility of the governance of 'andhra' region which formed a part of Chola kingdom in 12 century AD. Their capital was Dhanadapura, the modern Chandolu. Chandolu inscriptions had thrown light on the details of the history of Telugu Chodas of Velanadu. According to poetical work Keyurabahucharitramu, the country enjoyed plenty and prosperity. "The capital Dhanadapura (Chandolu) was a magnificent city with beautiful structures and opulent markets. It was comparable to the city of Kubera". Mallikarjuna Panditaradhyudu (1120-1180)'s 'Sivatatvasara' and Palkuri Somanadha (12 or 13th century)'s Basava Purana reflect the prosperity of Dhanadapura. Mallikarjuna Panditaradhyudu debated with Buddhist scholars in the court of King Velanati Choda of the Chandavolu kingdom. There is a mound outside village which may have Buddhist remains. In 2019, a 855-years-old Telugu inscription on a pillar by Kulotthunga Rajendra Choda, a velanti chief who ruled from Chandolu was rediscovered at Enikepadu, on the outskirts of Vijayawada by Dr. E Shivanagi. A manual of Kistna district in Madras Presidency, published in 1883, mentions, "The country between Tsandavolu and Tenali awaits an archeologist, for in almost every village there are inscriptions not yet properly deciphered". Rudra Deva's son Ganapati overcame Velanadu chieftains is indicated by existence of an inscription of his at Chandhavolu, their kingdom. The village was the seat of Velanati Chodas in the 12th century, the most famous of whom was Rajendra Choda. It was a flourishing town during Choda times. It was also called as Dhandapura or Tsandavole. 

The village is mentioned in ancient ballads and poems. In the temple are four inscriptions, three of which bear dates equivalent to AD 1154, 1171, and 1176. A ruined fort, dating to 15 -16th century, was recognized as a historical protected monument   Bandlamma temple, dating to the 18th century, is another protected monument. Bandlamma is a Dravidian goddess.

Literature 
The name of the town Chandole echoes with the name of a prominent spiritual personality and a Vedic scholar Tadepalli Raghavanarayana Saastri who lived here for entire life. Subrahmanya Saastri, a disciple of Chandole Rishi, has written Pita Putra Kavisvarulu-Chandolu Maharashulu. His other disciple Cheruvu Satyanaarayana Saastri has also written a similar text namely, Pitaputra Kavicharitramu in Telugu on Chandole Saastri. Neelamraju Venkata Seshaiah, formerly an editor of Andhra Prabha, a renowned Telugu daily published from The Indian Express group that time, offered a couple of instances that explained the spiritual heights Chandole Rishi ascended during his lifetime in his book published in Telugu namely Nadiche Devudu.

Government and politics 

Chandole gram panchayat is the local self-government of the village. It is divided into wards and each ward is represented by a ward member. The ward members are headed by a Sarpanch.

Education 

As per the school information report for the academic year 2018–19, the village has a total of 18 schools. These include 5 private, one other type and 12 Zilla Parishad/Mandal Parishad schools.

Transport

Ancient roads 
From Tsandavolu, roads go to Bapatla and Ponnur with a small branch to the lock at Intur and old trace of Madras road has an avenue of tree. From Tsandavolu, the line of old Madras road goes south-west to Bapatla crossing a channel by a good bridge near Buddam. This channel and canal both enter back water close to Nizampatnam. In 1679, Mr. Streynsham Master earmarked  that the proper name is Nyshampatnam.

Present roads 
The village is connected with Ponnur, Tenali, Repalle, Nizampatnam and Bapatla by road.

See also 
List of villages in Guntur district

References 

Villages in Guntur district